A Regius Professor 
is a university professor who has, or originally had, royal patronage or appointment. They are a unique feature of academia in the United Kingdom and Ireland. The first Regius Professorship was in the field of medicine, and founded by the Scottish King James IV at the University of Aberdeen in 1497. Regius chairs have since been instituted in various universities, in disciplines judged to be fundamental and for which there is a continuing and significant need. Each was established by an English, Scottish, or British monarch, and following proper advertisement and interview through the offices of the university and the national government, the current monarch still appoints the professor (except for those at the University of Dublin in Ireland, which left the United Kingdom in 1922). This royal imprimatur, and the relative rarity of these professorships, means a Regius chair is prestigious and highly sought-after.

Regius Professors are traditionally addressed as "Regius" and not "Professor". The University of Glasgow currently has the highest number of extant Regius chairs, at fourteen.

Traditionally, Regius Chairs only existed in the seven ancient universities of the UK and Ireland. In October 2012 it was announced that Queen Elizabeth II would create up to six new Regius Professorships, to be announced in early 2013, to mark her Diamond Jubilee. In January 2013 the full list was announced, comprising twelve new chairs, probably the largest number ever created in one year, and more than created in most centuries. In July 2015 it was announced that further Regius Professorships would be created to mark the Queen's 90th birthday.

University of Aberdeen

Regius Professor of Anatomy (1863)
Regius Professor of Botany
Regius Professor of English Literature
Regius Professor of Greek
Regius Professor of Humanity, formerly Regius Professor of Classics
Regius Professor of Logic
Regius Professor of Mathematics (1703)
Regius Professor of Medicine, formerly Regius Professor of Materia Medica (1858)
Regius Professor of Moral Philosophy
Regius Professor of Natural History
Regius Professor of Obstetrics and Gynaecology, formerly Regius Professor of Midwifery (1858)
Regius Professor of Pathology
Regius Professor of Physiology (1858)
Regius Professor of Surgery (1839)

Aston University 
Regius Professor of Pharmacy

Cardiff University 
Regius Professor of Chemistry (2016)

University of Cambridge

Regius Professor of Botany (1724/2009)
Regius Professor of Civil Law (1540)
Regius Professor of Divinity (1540)
Regius Professor of Engineering (2011)
Regius Professor of Greek (1540)
Regius Professor of Hebrew (1540)
Regius Professor of History (1724)
Regius Professor of Physic (1540)

University of Dublin

Regius Professor of Divinity (1600/1761)
Regius Professor of Physic (1637?)
Regius Professor of Laws (1668)
Regius Professor of Feudal and English Law (1761–1934)
Regius Professor of Greek (1761)
Regius Professor of Surgery (1852/1868)

University of Dundee

Regius Professor of Life Sciences (2013)

University of Edinburgh

Regius Professor of Public Law and the Law of Nature and Nations (1707)
Regius Professor of Rhetoric and English Literature (1762)
Regius Professor of Astronomy (1785)
Regius Professor of Clinical Surgery (1803)
Regius Professor of Medical Science 
Regius Professor of Forensic Medicine (1807)
Regius Professor of Sanskrit (1862) (now the Regius Professor of South Asian Language, Culture and Society)
Regius Professor of Engineering (1868)
Regius Professor of Geology (1871)
Regius Chair of Plant Science

University of Essex
Regius Professor of Political Science (2013)

University of Glasgow

Regius Professor of Medicine and Therapeutics (1637/1713)
Regius Professor of Materia Medica (1831–1989) (merged with the Regius chair in Medicine and Therapeutics)
Regius Professor of Law (1713)
Regius Professor of Anatomy (1718)
Regius Professor of Astronomy (1760)
Regius Professor of Zoology (1807)
Regius Professor of Obstetrics and Gynaecology (1815)
Regius Professor of Surgery (1815)
Regius Professor of Chemistry (1817)
Regius Professor of Botany (1818)
Regius Professor of Forensic Medicine (1839)
Regius Professor of Physiology (1839)
Regius Professor of Civil Engineering and Mechanics (1840)
Regius Professor of English Language and Literature (1861)
Regius Professor of Ecclesiastical History (1716–1935) (ceased being a Regius chair in 1935)
Regius Professor of Precision Medicine (2016)
Regius Professor of Law 2012

Imperial College of Science, Technology and Medicine
Regius Professor of Engineering (2013)
Regius Professor of Infectious Disease (2016)

University of Liverpool 
Regius Professor of Chemistry (2016)

University of London 
Regius Professor of Cancer Research (2016) (Based at The Institute of Cancer Research)
Regius Professor of Psychiatry (2013) (Based at King's College London)
Regius Professor of Economics (2013) (Based at LSE)
 Regius Professor of Music (2013) (Based at Royal Holloway)

University of Manchester

Regius Professor of Physics (2013)
Regius Professor of Materials (2016)

Newcastle University 
Regius Professor of Ageing (2016)

Open University

Regius Professor of Open Education (2013)

University of Oxford

Regius Professor of Civil Law (c.1540)
Regius Professor of Divinity (1535)
Regius Professor of Moral and Pastoral Theology (1842)
Regius Professor of Ecclesiastical History (1842)
Regius Professor of Hebrew (1546)
Regius Professor of Medicine (1546)
Regius Professor of Greek (c.1541)
Regius Professor of Modern History (1724)
Regius Professor of Mathematics (2016)

Queen's University Belfast 
Regius Professor of Electronics & Computer Engineering (2016)

University of Reading

Regius Professor of Meteorology and Climate Science (2013)

University of St Andrews

Regius Professor of Mathematics (1668)

University of Southampton

Regius Professor of Computer Science (2013)
Regius Professorship in Ocean Sciences (2016)

University of Surrey

Regius Professor of Electronic Engineering (2013)

University of Warwick

 Regius Professor of Mathematics (2013)
Regius Professor of Manufacturing (2016)

References

 
1497 establishments in England 
1497 establishments in Scotland
1497 establishments in Ireland